Claudia Fischer (born 24 May 1981 as Claudia Toth) was the Austrian national women's curling team skip from 2004-2007.

She has played in four European Championships, skipping her Austrian team to an 11th-place finish in 2004, 9th place in 2005, 11th place in 2006 and 9th place in 2007.

Since then, Fischer has played in several international mixed events, including winning a bronze medal at the 2012 World Mixed Doubles Curling Championship with Christian Roth. Fischer and Roth represented Austria at the 2013 and 2014 Mixed Doubles World Championships as well, finishing 8th place on both occasions.

Personal life
Her younger sister Karina Toth is also a curler, they was teammates many years.

She attended the Bundesgymnasium/Bundesoberstufenrealgymnasium St. Johann in Tirol, Austria, from 1991 to 1999.

In 2005, she posed nude in a calendar to promote women's curling.

See also
 Ana Arce
 Daniela Jentsch
 Melanie Robillard
 Kasia Selwand
 Lynsay Ryan

References

External links
 
 The Curling News
 Curling calendar creating stir
 Calendar to provide funds for players in European nations
 Women of curling gain greater exposure

1981 births
Living people
Austrian female curlers